The Tween Summit is a yearly event hosted by the NCMEC, Cox Communications, and John Walsh where young people aged 8–14 and their parents gather in Washington DC to discuss internet safety.

Topics at the 3rd Annual event in 2008
John Walsh and Lauren Nelson, Miss America 2007 hosted the discussion which covered research on the behavior of young people, primarily those between the ages of eight and twelve.

Results of Survey
 73% of tweens report that their parents have talked to them "a lot" about internet safety
 96% tell their parents at least some of what they do online
 79% tell their parents everything
 91% of those who tell someone when they receive online messages from strangers reach out to mom and dad
 91% are online by age 9
 27% admit to lying about their age online
 One in ten have responded to and chatted online with people they do not know
 One in five have posted personal info about themselves on the internet
 The number of kids online nearly even triples from ages eight to ten and eleven to fourteen

See also
 ThinkUKnow

References

External links
 The National Center for Missing and Exploited Children
 Cox Take Charge Website
 Fox Business July 22, 2008

Internet safety